
Pruszków County is a unit of territorial administration and local government (powiat) in Masovian Voivodeship, east-central Poland. It came into being on January 1, 1999, as a result of the Polish local government reforms passed in 1998.

As of 2019 its total population is 165,039, out of which the population of Pruszków is 62,076, that of Piastów is 22,619, that of Brwinów is 13,601, and the rural population is 66,743.

Neighbouring counties
Pruszków County is bordered by Warsaw West County to the north, the city of Warsaw to the east, Piaseczno County to the south-east and Grodzisk Mazowiecki County to the west.

Administrative division
The county is subdivided into six gminas (two urban, one urban-rural and three rural). These are listed in the following table, in descending order of population.

References

 
Land counties of Masovian Voivodeship